Joe's Camouflage is a compilation album by Frank Zappa, released posthumously in January 2014 by The Zappa Family Trust on Zappa Records. It represents the first official release of material by a band Zappa assembled for rehearsals in the summer of 1975 but which never toured or recorded material in the studio.

History
According to the liner notes, the work comprises cassettes of rehearsals (recorded by Denny Walley) and the analog 4 tracks which Joe Travers transferred and mixed.

Track listing

Personnel

Musicians
 Frank Zappa – guitar, vocals
 Denny Walley – guitars, vocals
 Robert "Frog" Camarena – vocals, guitar
 Novi Novog – viola, keyboards, vocals
 Napoleon Murphy Brock – tenor sax, vocals
 Roy Estrada – bass, vocals
 Terry Bozzio – drums
Special mention:
 Andre Lewis - keyboards, vocals

Vaultmeisterment
 Joe Travers for UMRK

References 

Frank Zappa compilation albums
2014 compilation albums
Compilation albums published posthumously